Elemeno Pea is a play written in 2011 by Molly Smith Metzler. It premiered on March 8, 2011 as part of the 35th anniversary of the Humana Festival of New American Plays in Louisville, Kentucky.

Plot summary
Summer is almost over when blue collar social worker Devon visits her sister Simone at the wealthy estate where she works on Martha's Vineyard.   Simone is the personal assistant to the wife of a billionaire.  The owners are supposed to be away, but trouble ensues when the trophy wife Michaela unexpectedly returns.  The story plays out in the luxurious guest house of the estate and includes an eccentric boyfriend and a put upon servant.  Unexpected depths of character emerge as wise cracking Devon, ambitious aspiring author Simone, and universally despised Michaela interact with alternately comic and touching effect!

Production history
 March 2011:  World premiere at Actors Theatre of Louisville in Louisville, KY
 February 2012:  West Coast premiere at South Coast Repertory in Costa Mesa, CA
 February 2013:  Mixed Blood Theatre Company in Minneapolis, MN
August 2013:  Carolina Actors Studio Theatre in Charlotte, NC
October 2013: California State University, Northridge in Los Angeles, CA 
January 2014:  B Street Theatre in Sacramento, CA

References

2011 plays